Horse Ranch Mountain is an  mountain in the Kolob Canyons section of Zion National Park in northeastern Washington County, Utah, United States, that is the highest summit within the national park. It rises above Camp Creek to the north and Taylor Creek to the south.

See also

 List of mountains in Utah

References

External links

 Photographs of the Kolob Canyon area
 
 A hike near Horse Ranch Mountain

Mountains of Utah
Mountains of Washington County, Utah
Zion National Park
Highest points of United States national parks